Zuppa alla modenese ("soup in the style of Modena") is an Italian soup made with stock, spinach, butter, salt, eggs, Parmesan cheese, nutmeg and croutons.

See also

 List of Italian soups

References

Italian soups
Modena
Cuisine of Emilia-Romagna